Justo Alcides Méndez Rodriguez (December 2, 1917 – September 2, 1995) was a Puerto Rican politician who served as a Senator in the Puerto Rico Legislature.

Education and career
He was born in Lares, Puerto Rico. He later studied Engineering at the College of Agriculture and Mechanic Arts in Mayaguez, there he joined the Beta chapter of Phi Sigma Alpha fraternity.  He married Provi O. and had three children.

He began his career as a Chemical analyst at the Central Plata in 1941, then he was Chief of chemicals at the Central Los Canos, in Arecibo in 1943.  He was a member of the US armed forces from 1943 to 1946, later he worked as Gen. Sipt. at Central Los Canos from 1946 to 1950.  Afterward on he was Executive Vice-President of the Central Fed. Savings & Loan Assn. from 1958 to 1964.  After that he was President of San Martin Mortgage & investment Corp. from 1964 until 1967. He served as President of the Junta Planificacion of Arecibo and was a former member of the Junta of Corp Dirs. of Urban Renovation of Housing, and the Junta Dirs. Of the Housing Bank.

Political career

He was elected Senator for the first time in 1968 as a member from the New Progressive Party (NPP)  In the 1968 Senate elections he almost beat out PPD Rafael Hernandez Colon for President when the first vote in the senate was tied 12 to 12, yet in the second round of votes he lost by one vote. The reason for the tie was that some PPD senators such as Lionel Fernández Méndez voted in blank.

From 1968 till 1972 he was the Minority Leader in the Senate, but after the 1972 elections Carlos Romero Barcelo supported José Menéndez Monroig to be selected to that position instead. He was also Secretary of Agriculture of Puerto Rico.  In 1984 he switched to the Popular Democratic Party (PDP) after a bitter internal fight with Carlos Romero. From May 22, 1986 til December 31, 1988 Secretary of the Department of Natural and Environmental Resources. He died in September 1995 at the age of 77 in San Juan, Puerto Rico.

See also

University of Puerto Rico at Mayaguez people

References

1917 births
1995 deaths
Members of the Senate of Puerto Rico
New Progressive Party (Puerto Rico) politicians
People from Lares, Puerto Rico
Secretaries of Agriculture of Puerto Rico
Secretaries of Natural and Environmental Resources of Puerto Rico
20th-century American politicians